is a slice of life romance josei manga series written and illustrated by Keiko Nishi. It was published by Shogakukan on Flowers magazine and in four volumes compiling the chapters. A live action romantic drama film adaptation was released on February 14, 2015. It's directed by Ryūichi Hiroki and written by Hiroshi Saitō. It stars Nana Eikura and Etsushi Toyokawa.

Cast
Nana Eikura as Tsugumi Dozono
Etsushi Toyokawa as Jun Kaieda
Osamu Mukai as Toshio Nakagawa
Sakura Andō as Saki Akimoto
Tomoya Maeno as Satoshi Sonoda
Motoki Ochiai as Takahiro Tomono
Toshie Negishi as Kyoko
Mari Hamada as Sayoko
Yū Tokui as Tamio
Hana Kino as Kayo Sakata
Minami as a female receptionist
Mayuko Iwasa as Harumi Tomioka
Kentarō Sakaguchi as Nobuo

Volumes
1 (March 10, 2009)
2 (October 10, 2009)
3 (March 10, 2010)
4 (September 24, 2012)

Music
The soundtrack of the film is by Kōji Endō and the theme song is "Hold me, Hold you." by JUJU.

Reception
Volume 3 of the manga reached the 17th place on the weekly Oricon manga chart and, as of March 14, 2010, has sold 37,260 copies; volume 4 reached the 3rd place and, as of October 7, 2012, has sold 166,735 copies.

The manga was nominated for the third Manga Taishō in 2010, ranking 5th out of the 10 nominees with 48 points.

In a review of the film, Maggie Lee of Variety said that "foot fetishists will rejoice, but this is an otherwise wholesome, mellow May–September romance."

References

External links
Otoko no Isshō on Shogakukan 
Official website of the film 

2009 manga
2015 romantic drama films
Live-action films based on manga
Films directed by Ryūichi Hiroki
Japanese romantic drama films
Josei manga
Manga adapted into films
Romance anime and manga
Shogakukan manga
Slice of life anime and manga
2010s Japanese films